Ezequiél Moreno y Díaz, OAR was a Spanish Catholic friar in the Order of Augustinian Recollects and now venerated as a saint. He was born on April 9, 1848, in Alfaro, La Rioja, Spain and later served as a missionary to the Philippines. He also became the Bishop of Pinara and later of Pasto, in Colombia.

His nephew Julián Moreno is also venerated as a Blessed because of his martyrdom in Motril. Moreno is popularly invoked as the patron of cancer patients.

Early life and entry to the Order of Augustinian Recollects
Born in the city of Alfaro, La Rioja, Spain to Félix Moreno and María Josefa Díaz, he was the third of six children along with Eustaquio, Juana, Valentina and Benigna. His fourth sister, named María de las Candelas, died.

Moreno first wore the habit of the Recoletos in Monteagudo, Navarra, Spain on September 21, 1864. Later, he made his solemn vow in Marcialla (also in Navarra) on September 22, 1868.

Philippine missions

Arrival and ordination in Manila
The monastery in Monteagudo was known for dispatching missionaries to both the Americas and the Philippines. As expected, Moreno sailed for Manila, the capital of the Captaincy General of the Philippines, arriving there on February 10, 1870.

In the middle that year, Moreno sailed on to the Visayan town of Jaro, Iloilo where he received and finished his minor orders. A year later, he returned to Manila to receive his sacerdotal orders from the Archbishop of Manila, Gregorio Melitón Martínez. Today, the letter of the archbishop informing him of his sacerdotal ordination is one of the best-preserved manuscripts from the period.
After ordination, he was immediately sent to his first mission in Calapan, Oriental Mindoro. There, he became proficient in Tagalog that at his canonisation, Filipino Catholics remarked that the language is now "a language of the saints."

Provincial assignments
Two years after his arrival in the colony, he undertook the arduous task of being Military Chaplain to a penal colony, now Iwahig Prison and Penal Farm, in Puerto Princesa City. He was among the founders of the town of Aborlan, Palawan and Barangay Inagawan in Puerto Princesa. Moreno was struck by malaria, which forced him to leave the island.

When he was able to recover from the disease, he was again made in charge of a mission in Calapan. Though only 28 years old, both the Archbishop of Manila and his Recollect Prior assigned him as Vicar Forane of Mindoro.

Return to Manila and surrounding areas
In 1876, he was transferred to what is now Las Piñas and worked zealously for the development of the lives of the people in the area. The town suffered many major calamities during his pastorship, yet the people did not lose hope because of his example. This saintly way of life that he exemplified caused the people of Las Piñas to oppose his transfer to Santo Tomás, Batangas.

The appeal, as strong as it was, was not successful and Moreno was transferred to Santo Tomás. However, he was recalled to Manila because he was appointed General Preacher of the Order of Augustinian Recollects. The people of Santo Tomas also made an appeal to suspend the order but like what happened in Las Piñas, their request was not granted. He assumed the post in October 1880 and as Preacher General, was assigned parish priest of Santa Cruz Church, assuming the post in February 1881.

A year later, he was assigned to take charge of the Recollect hacienda in the towns of Imus and Bacoor in Cavite. During his stay, the towns were struck by cholera and the priest worked hard to administer the Last Rites to as many of the faithful as possible that of the 3,200 victims, only three died without receiving the Last Rites.

Election as superior of Monteagudo
His saintly life made him elected as Superior to the Seminary in Monteagudo in 1885. Through this post, Moreno imparted his missionary zeal to many missionaries to the Americas and the Philippines.

Colombian missions
It was in 1888 that he once more crossed the Atlantic Ocean and became the head of the Recollect mission in Colombia. He served as Vicar apostolic of Casanare and was named bishop of Pinara, Colombia on October 23, 1893. He became Bishop of Pasto, Colombia on December 2, 1893. He was noted for his generous charity to the faithful of his diocese and his ardent attacks against the liberal party from the pulpit.

Involvement in Colombian politics

As most of the Colombian Church hierarchy, Ezequiel Moreno aligned himself with the Colombian Conservative Party. During the Thousand Days War, he used his writings and preaching sermons to attack the Colombian Liberal Party and to urge Catholics to fight the liberals and to "defend their religion with Remingtons and machetes", promising automatic absolution.

Bibliography 

 Rafael Lazcano, Episcopologio agustiniano. Agustiniana, Guadarrama (Madrid), 2014, vol. II, 2024–2063. [Life, works, studies, iconography and wegraphy).

External links

Recoletos Communications
Parton Saints Index

References

1848 births
1906 deaths
Augustinian saints
19th-century Roman Catholic bishops in Colombia
20th-century Roman Catholic bishops in Colombia
Colombian Roman Catholic saints
Spanish Roman Catholic saints
20th-century Christian saints
Canonizations by Pope John Paul II
Roman Catholic bishops of Pasto